Pastreich is a surname. Notable people with the surname include:

Emanuel Pastreich (born 1964), American academic
Michael Pastreich (born 1966), American performing arts executive
Peter Pastreich (born 1938), American orchestra executive and father of Emanuel Pastreich and Michael Pastreich

References